Hans is a 2006 Italian film directed by Louis Nero.

Plot
Hans is the story of the increasing paranoia of Hans Schabe, the lead character and a disturbed individual, whose schizophrenia has accompanied him throughout his life.

Cast
Daniele Savoca: Hans Schabe
Simona Nasi: Girlfriend
Franco Nero: Judge/Tramp
Eugenio Allegri: mad
Silvano Agosti: Tramp
Sax Nicosia: TV Man

References

External links
 
 

Italian drama films
2006 films
Films directed by Louis Nero
2000s Italian films